Four Jacks is a 2001 Australian thriller.

The movie won best film, best male director and best male actor at the 2001 Melbourne Underground Film Festival.

References

External links

Four Jacks at National Film and Sound Archive
Four Jacks at Oz Movies

Australian action thriller films
2001 action thriller films
2001 films
2000s English-language films
2000s Australian films